Marathon Elementary School may refer to:
 Marathon Elementary School, Hopkinton, Massachusetts
 Elementary portion of Marathon Independent School District, Marathon, Texas

See also
 Marathon Area Elementary School, Marathon, Wisconsin, Marathon School District